Headley et al. v. Church of Scientology International et al. was a court case filed in 2009 by Claire and Marc Headley against the Church of Scientology International alleging that the organization had violated laws against human trafficking and violated their human rights during their time of employment in the Sea Org. The Federal District Court decided that ministerial exemption protected the Church of Scientology from litigation and dismissed the case.  The Headleys appealed. In 2012, the United States Court of Appeals for the Ninth Circuit affirmed the lower court's dismissal; it did not address the Constitutional issues of the trafficking and abuse claims (as had the lower court), but said that there was insufficient evidence that the Headley's had been obtained by "serious harm, threats or other improper methods."

History
In 2009, Marc and Claire Headley sued the Church under the federal Victims of Trafficking and Violence Protection Act of 2000. In response, Church lawyers argued that the First Amendment prohibited the courts from considering "a forced labor claim premised upon ... social and psychological factors", because they concern "the beliefs, the religious upbringing, the religious training, the religious practices, the religious lifestyle restraints of a religious order."

Ruling
The Church acknowledged that the rules under which the Headleys lived included a ban on having children, censored mail, monitored phone calls, needing permission to have Internet access and being disciplined through manual labor. The U.S. 9th Circuit Court of Appeals noted in a ruling given in July 2012 that Marc Headley had been made to clean human excrement by hand from an aeration pond on the compound with no protective equipment, while Claire Headley was banned from the dining hall for up to eight months in 2002. She lost  as a result of subsisting on protein bars and water. In addition, she had two abortions to comply with the Sea Org's no-children policy. The Headleys also experienced physical violence from Scientology executives and saw others being treated violently.

The court found that the church enjoyed the protection of the free exercise of religion clause in the First Amendment, and that the "ministerial exemptions" in employment law prevented the government from interfering in the treatment of its ministers. The judge ruled that the First Amendment disallowed the courts from "examining church operations rooted in religious scripture". Bringing the Church to account for how it disciplined its members was "precisely the type of entanglement that the religion clauses prohibit."

Headley took the case to the US Court of Appeals, but the 9th Circuit agreed with the judgment of the lower court.  The Court cited evidence that showed Headleys were fully informed of the requirements of the Sea Org, had multiple opportunities to leave and did not, and had no problem leaving when they did.  The Court suggested that other claims might have withstood appellate review, had the Headleys brought them, such as assault, battery or "any of a number of other theories that might have better fit the evidence."

As author of the Court's opinion, Judge Diarmuid F. O’Scannlain wrote: "The act bars an employer from obtaining another's labor 'by means of' force, physical restraint, serious harm, threats or an improper scheme ... That text is a problem for the Headleys because the record contains little evidence that the defendants obtained the Headleys' labor 'by means of' serious harm, threats or other improper methods."

The Court took note that the Headleys lived off base and had many opportunities to leave, but stayed of their own will.

Comment 
Tampa lawyer Greg W. Kehoe, a 25-year Justice Department veteran, stated, "Here is a court saying, albeit in a civil situation ... that there is nothing improper with this type of conduct and no ill motive can be imbued to the church."

An FBI investigation of similar complaints against the Church was dropped around the same time as the lower court ruling in the Headley case, possibly because of it.  Former U.S. federal prosecutor Michael Seigel said of the ruling, "It's very straightforward. It's sweeping. And (it) doesn't seem to leave much room for hope of success on a criminal prosecution."

References

Scientology litigation
Ministerial exception case law
United States Court of Appeals for the Ninth Circuit cases
Human trafficking in the United States
Scientology beliefs and practices
2012 in United States case law
2012 in religion
United States District Court for the Central District of California cases